Yen Plus was an American monthly anthology magazine of Japanese manga, Korean manhwa, and original English-language (OEL) manga published by Yen Press.

History
The first issue of Yen Plus went on sale on July 29, 2008, with five manga titles originally published by Gangan Comics, four manhwa titles, and two OEL manga titles. The magazine contained over 450 pages per issue. Manga titles were read from right-to-left, while manhwa and OEL manga titles read left-to-right; because of this, each issue had two covers.

Although Yen Plus did not publicize official circulation figures, Hachette Book Group publicity materials for the Maximum Ride OEL manga reported a circulation figure for Yen Plus of "nearly 100,000 copies" as of late 2008.

The July 2010 issue was the last issue of the physical magazine to be published; all subsequent issues were exclusively published online. In December 2013, the online magazine also folded.

Serialized titles
This is a complete list of all titles serialized in Yen Plus. It does not include single chapter previews of titles. Twenty titles (ten manga, six manhwa and four OEL manga) were serialized, but only two (the manhwa One Fine Day and Pig Bride) were serialized in their entirety.

Manga

Manhwa

OEL manga

See also 

 List of manga magazines published outside of Japan

References

External links
Official website

Anime and manga magazines
Monthly magazines published in the United States
Online magazines published in the United States
Defunct magazines published in the United States
Magazines established in 2008
Magazines disestablished in 2010
Manhwa magazines
Online magazines with defunct print editions
Magazines published in New York City